This is a list of mountain passes.

Africa

Egypt
 Halfaya Pass (near Libya)

Lesotho
 Moteng Pass
 Mahlasela pass
 Sani Pass

Morocco
 Tizi n'Tichka

South Africa
 Eastern Cape Passes
 Western Cape Passes
 Northern Cape Passes
 KwaZulu Natal Passes
 Free State Passes
 Limpopo Province Passes
 Mpumalanga Passes
 Gauteng Passes
 Northwest Province Passes
 Swartberg Pass (Western Cape)
 Lootsberg Pass

Asia

Afghanistan 
 Broghol Pass to Pakistan
 Dorah Pass to Pakistan
 Hajigak Pass
 Khost-Gardez Pass
 Khyber Pass to Pakistan
 Kotal-e Khushk
 Kushan Pass linking northern Afghanistan to the region.
 Lataband Pass
 Tang-e Gharu is a gorge which links Afghanistan with Pakistan
 Salang Pass crosses the Hindu Kush linking Kabul with northern Afghanistan – nowadays through a tunnel.
 Wakhjir Pass to China

China
 Pingxingguan Pass, Shanxi
 Jiayu Pass, Beijing
 Jianmen Pass, Sichuan
 Niangzi Pass, Border between Shanxi and Hebei
 Yanmen Pass, Shanxi
 Alataw Pass to Kazakhstan
 Dongkhala to India
 Jelep La to India
 Karakoram Pass to India
 Khunjerab Pass to Pakistan
 Kilik Pass to Pakistan
 Kulma Pass to Tajikistan
 Mintaka Pass to Pakistan
 Nathu La to India
 Semo Pass, Tibet (18,258 ft)
 Tanggula Pass, Tibet
 Torugart Pass to Kyrgyzstan
 Irkeshtam Pass to Kyrgyzstan
 Wakhjir Pass to Afghanistan

Hong Kong

India

Indonesia
 Puncak Pass, West Java

Japan 
 Usui Pass between Nagano and Gunma Prefectures

Kyrgyzstan 
See: List of mountain passes in Kyrgyzstan

Malaysia
 Genting Sempah on the border of Pahang and Selangor

Nepal

 Thorong La 5416 m. Annapurna Circuit Region
 West col 6135 m. Makalu Barun
 East Col 6100 m. Makalu Barun
 Sherpani Col Makalu Barun
 Cho La 5420 m. Mount EverestRegion
 Larky Pass 5213 m. Manaslu
 Kagmara La 5115 m. Southern Dolpo
 Ganja La 5106 m. Langtang Helambu Region
 Meso Kanta 5089 m. Annapurna Region
 Khangla Pass 5320 m. ( Annapurna manang region )
 Khongma La Pass 5535m (Everest Khumbu Region)
 Renjo La Pass 5360m (Everest Khumbu Region)

Pakistan
 Babusar pass
 Bolan Pass
 Broghol Pass to Afghanistan
 Chaprot Pass
 Dorah Pass to Afghanistan
 Gondogoro Pass
 Gumal Pass
 Hayal Pass
 Hispar Pass
 Karakar Pass
 Khunjerab Pass to China
 Khyber Pass to Afghanistan
 Kilik Pass to China
 Kohat Pass
 Lowari Pass
 Malakand Pass
 Mintaka Pass to China
 Naltar Pass
 Shandur Top
 Tochi Pass Connects Ghazni to Bannu

South Korea

Tajikistan
 Ak-Baital Pass (4,655 m)
 Anzob Pass (3,400 m)
 Beyik Pass to China (4,600 m)
 Kulma Pass to China (4,362 m)
 Kyzylart Pass to Kyrgyzstan (4,280 m)

Turkey
Amanian Gates (Bahçe Pass), on border between Osmaniye and Gaziantep provinces
 Cilician Gates (Gülek Pass), Mersin Province
 Sertavul Pass, on border between Mersin and Karaman provinces
 Syrian Gates (Belen Pass), Hatay Province
 Zigana Pass, on border between Gümüşhane and Trabzon provinces

Uzbekistan
 Kamchik Pass

Australasia

Australia
 Alpine Way, New South Wales
 Macquarie Pass, New South Wales
 Kings Highway (Australia), New South Wales
 Cunninghams Gap, Queensland
 Heavitree Gap, Northern Territory
 Horrocks Pass, South Australia
 Nowlands Gap, New South Wales
 Pichi Richi Pass, South Australia
 Tawonga Gap, Victoria

New Zealand

Europe

Alps 

 Col de l'Argentière – France/Italy
 Arlberg Pass – Austria
 Bernina Pass – Switzerland
 Bielerhöhe Pass – Austria
 Bocchetta del Croso – Italy
 Bocchetto Sessera – Italy
 Col de la Bonette – France
 Brenner Pass – Austria/Italy
 Colle di Cadibona  – Italy
 Colle della Croce – France/Italy
 Falzarego Pass – Italy
 Fern Pass – Austria
 Col Ferret – Italy/Switzerland
 Flexen Pass – Austria
 Flüela Pass – Switzerland
 Col du Fréjus – Italy/France
 Furka Pass – Switzerland
 Col du Galibier – France
 Passo Garlenda – Italy
 Gemmi Pass – Switzerland
 Grimsel Pass – Switzerland
 Giau Pass – Italy
 Grossglockner High Alpine Road
 Hiaslegg (Tragöß-Oberort – Trofaiach)
 Col de l'Iseran (elevation 2770 m) – highest paved mountain pass in the Alps
 Col de la Joux Verte – France 
 Julier Pass – Switzerland
 Klausen Pass
 Krumbach Saddle
 Loibl Pass (Ljubelj Pass) – Austria/Slovenia
 Maloja Pass
 Nufenen Pass
 Oberalp Pass
 Petit Col Ferret – Italy/Switzerland
 Plöcken Pass (Passo di Monte Croce Carnico) Austria/Italy
 Pordoi Pass – Italy
 Pötschen Pass
 Predil Pass (Predel Pass) – Italy/Slovenia
 Pyhrn Pass
 Colle del Quazzo  – Italy
 Col de Restefond
 Colle della Rho (Col de la Roue) – Italy/France
 Col Saint Martin
 San Bernardino Pass
 Colle San Bernardo
 San Boldo Pass
 Schober Pass – Austria
 Colle Scravaion – Italy
 Colle delle Selle Vecchie – Italy/France                    
 Semmering Pass
 Septimer Pass
 Colle Sestriere
 Colle dei Signori – Italy/France
 Simplon Pass
 Soboth (Soboški prelaz) – Austria
 Splügen Pass
 Great St Bernard Pass
 Little St Bernard Pass
 St. Gotthard Pass
 Stelvio Pass (Stilfserjoch)
 Susten Pass
 Packsattel – Austria
 Radl Pass (Radeljski prelaz) – Austria/Slovenia 
 Passo della Teglia – Italy
 Col de Tende – France/Italy
 Giogo di Toirano – Italy
 Tremalzo Pass
 Umbrail Pass
 Wurzen Pass
 Vršič Pass – Slovenia

Apennines 
* Bocca Trabaria pass
 Bocca Serriola pass
 Bocchetta Pass
 Calla pass
 Colle di Cadibona
 Capannelle Pass
 Cisa Pass
 Passo del Faiallo
 Futa Pass
 Giovi Pass
 Mandrioli pass
 Montecoronaro pass
 Muraglione pass
 Passo della Limina
 Pescara Pass
 Valico di San Fermo
 Scheggia Pass
 Passo del Turchino
 Viamaggio pass
 Raticosa pass

Carpathians

Georgia
 Abano Pass
 Jvari Pass
 Mamison Pass
 Rikoti Pass
 Roki Tunnel
 Zekari Pass

Greece
 Baros Pass
 Katara Pass
 Thermopylae

Iceland
 Fimmvörðuháls

Ireland
 Barnesmore Gap
 Conor Pass
 Gap of Dunloe
 Healy Pass
 Mamore Gap 
 Moll's Gap
 Wicklow Gap

Jura Mountains

 Col de l'Aiguillon
 Balmberg Pass
 Benkerjoch
 Bözberg Pass
 Breitehöchi Pass
 Bürersteig Pass
 Chall Pass
 Challhöchi Pass
 Col du Chasseral
 Chilchzimmersattel
 Col de la Croix
 Eichhöhe Pass
 Col des Étroits
 Col de la Givrine
 Col du Marchairuz
 Col du Mollendruz
 Mont Crosin
 Col du Mont d'Orzeires
 Col de Montvoie
 Oberer Hauenstein
 Passwang
 Col de Pierre Pertuis
 Les Pontins
 Col des Rangiers
 Col des Roches
 Salhöhe
 Santelhöchi
 Schafmatt
 Schelten Pass
 Staffelegg
 La Tourne
 Unterer Hauenstein
 Vue des Alpes
 Weissenstein Pass

Montenegro
 Durmitor Pass
 Lovcen Pass

Norway

 Dovrefjell (road E6)(1026 m)
 Filefjell (road E16)(1004 m)
 Gaularfjellet (road 13)(745 m)
 Geirangervegen (road 63)(1038 m)
 Hardangervidda (road 7)(1250 m)
 Haukelifjell (road E134)(1085 m)
 Hemsedalsfjellet (road 52)(1137 m)
 Hol-Aurland (county road 50)(1165 m)
 Ørnevegen (road 63)(624 m)
 Saltfjellet (European route E6)(689 m)
 Sognefjell (road 55)(1434 m)
 Strynefjell (road 15)(943 m) (or road 258)(1139 m)
 Suleskarvegen (county road 450)(1050 m)
 Trollstigen (road 63)(850 m)
 Valdresflye (road 51)(1390 m)
 Venabygdsfjellet (road 27)
 Vikafjell (road 13)(988 m)

Norway/Sweden

 Bjørnfjell/Riksgränsen (road E10) (530 m)
 Funäsdalen–Ljungdalen (road Z531) (975 m)
 Funäsdalen–Røros (road 84/31) (840 m)
 Gäddede–Klimpfjäll (road AC1067) (876 m)
 Graddis (Arjeplog–Rognan) (road 95/77) (740 m)
 Sälen (road 66) (760 m)
 Storlien (road E14) (615 m)
 Tännäs (road 311) (850 m)
 Umbukta (road E12) (600 m in tunnel, 650 m along older pass road)

Portugal 
 Torre

Pyrenees

 Col d'Ares
 Col d'Aspin
 Col d'Aubisque
 Pas de la Casa
 Port de Larrau
 Port de Pailhères
 Col du Perthus
 El Portalet
 Portbou / Cerbère (more distinct: Coll dels Balitres)
 Col du Puymorens
 Col de la Quillane
 La Brèche de Roland
 Roncevaux Pass
 Somport
 Col du Tourmalet

Sierra Nevada (Spain)
 Puerto del Suspiro del Moro (Pass of the Moor's Sigh)

Great Britain

See:
 Mountain passes of England
 List of hill passes of the Lake District
 Mountain passes of Scotland
 Mountain passes of Wales

North America

Alaska

 Anderson Pass – Alaska Range
 Kahiltna Pass – Alaska Range
 Mentasta Pass – Alaska Range
 Polychrome Pass – Alaska Range
 Chilkat Pass – Boundary Range
 Chilkoot Pass – Boundary Range
 White Pass – Boundary Range
 Atigun Pass – Brooks Range
 Crow Pass – Chugach Range
 Powerline Pass – Chugach Range
 Thompson Pass – Chugach Range
 Portage Pass – Chugach Range
 Johnson Pass – Kenai Range
 Moose Pass – Kenai Range
 Resurrection Pass – Kenai Range
 Turnagain Pass – Kenai Range
 Hatcher Pass – Talkeetna Range

Appalachian Mountains 
 Appalachian Gap – Vermont
 Ashby Gap – Virginia
 Balsam Gap – North Carolina
 Brock Gap – Alabama
 Brocks Gap – Virginia
 Buck Creek Gap – North Carolina
 Buford's Gap – Virginia
 Bull Gap – North Carolina
 Carmans Notch – New York
 Chester Gap – Virginia
 Clarke's Gap – Virginia
 Cowee Gap – North Carolina
 Craven Gap – North Carolina
 Crawford Notch – New Hampshire
 Cumberland Gap – Virginia, Tennessee, Kentucky
 Cumberland Narrows – Maryland
 Deals Gap – North Carolina, Tennessee
 Deep Notch – New York
 Delaware Water Gap – Pennsylvania, New Jersey
 Diamond Notch – New York
 Dixville Notch – New Hampshire
 Evans Notch – Maine
 Fishers Gap – Virginia
 Franconia Notch – New Hampshire
 Gillespie Gap – North Carolina
 Goshen Pass – Virginia
 Grafton Notch – Maine
 Grandmother Gap – North Carolina
 Granville Notch – Vermont
 Hazen's Notch – Vermont
 Hillsboro Gap – Virginia
 Hobart Gap – New Jersey
 James River Gorge – Virginia
 Jarman Gap – Virginia
 Kancamagus Pass – New Hampshire
 Keyes Gap – Virginia, West Virginia
 Kinsman Notch – New Hampshire
 Lehigh Gap – Pennsylvania
 Lincoln Gap – Vermont
 Mahoosuc Notch – Maine
 Manassas Gap – Virginia
 Mechanicsburg Gap – West Virginia
 Middlebury Gap – Vermont
 Moccasin Gap – Virginia
 Monterey Pass – Pennsylvania
 New Market Gap – Virginia
 Newfound Gap – Tennessee, North Carolina
 Pinkham Notch – New Hampshire
 Potomac Water Gap – Maryland, Virginia, West Virginia
 Pound Gap – Kentucky, Virginia
 Rockfish Gap – Virginia
 Schuylkill Gap – Pennsylvania
 Sherburne Pass – Vermont
 Skinners Gap – West Virginia
 Smugglers Notch – Vermont
 Snickers Gap – Virginia
 Soco Gap – North Carolina
 Stony Clove Notch – New York
 Swatara Gap – Pennsylvania
 Swift Run Gap – Virginia
 Thornton Gap – Virginia
 Thoroughfare Gap – Virginia
 Wilson Gap – Virginia, West Virginia
 Zealand Notch – New Hampshire

California Coast Ranges
 Pacheco Pass – Central California
 Altamont Pass – Northern Central California, in the Diablo Range

Cascade Range 

 Allison Pass – British Columbia
 Austin Pass – Washington
 Blewett Pass (formerly known as Swauk Pass) – Washington
 Blizzard Gap – Oregon
 Bly Mountain Pass – Oregon
 Cady Pass – Washington
 Canyon Creek Pass – Oregon
 Cascade Pass – Washington
 Cayuse Pass – Washington
 Chinook Pass – Washington
 Colockum Pass – Washington
 Coquihalla Pass – British Columbia
 Cowhead Pass – British Columbia
 Crater Summit – Oregon
 Deer Creek Summit – Washington
 Disautel Summit – Washington
 Drews Gap – Oregon
 Elk Pass – Washington
 Green Pass – Washington
 Greensprings Summit
 Hayden Mountain Summit – Oregon
 Hogback Summit – Oregon
 Horse Ridge Summit – Oregon
 Lake of the Woods Summit
 Lolo Pass – Oregon
 Loup Loup Summit – Washington
 McKenzie Pass – Oregon
 Naches Pass – Washington
 Old Blewett Pass – Washington
 Pass Creek Pass – Washington
 Picture Rock Pass – Oregon
 Rainy Pass – Washington
 Rattlesnake Pass – Washington
 Santiam Pass- Oregon
 Sexton Mountain Pass – Oregon
 Sherman Pass – Washington
 Smith Hill Summit – Oregon
 Snoqualmie Pass – Washington
 Stage Road Pass – Oregon
 Stampede Pass – Washington
 Stevens Pass – Washington
 Sunday Summit – British Columbia
 Sun Pass – Oregon
 Washington and Rainy Passes (see North Cascades Highway) – Washington
 Wauconda Pass – Washington
 White Pass – Washington
 Willamette Pass – Oregon
 Windy Pass – Washington

Coast Mountains 

 Ash Pass – British Columbia
 Athelney Pass – British Columbia (Pacific Ranges)
 Cayoosh Pass – British Columbia (Lillooet Ranges/Cayoosh Range)
 Chilkat Pass – British Columbia
 Chilkoot Pass – Alaska, British Columbia
 Deception Pass – British Columbia (Coast Mountains/Rainbow Range)
 Elbow Pass – British Columbia (Chilcotin Ranges)
 Gnat Pass – British Columbia
 Griswold Pass – British Columbia (Chilcotin Ranges)
 Grizzly Pass – British Columbia (Pacific Ranges/Chilcotin Ranges)
 Heckman Pass – British Columbia (technically in the Rainbow Range, which is not Coast Mountains but Chilcotin Plateau)
 Iron Pass – British Columbia (Chilcotin Ranges)
 Lindquist Pass – British Columbia (Kitimat Ranges)
 Lord Pass – British Columbia (Pacific Ranges)
 McCuish Pass – British Columbia (Kitimat Ranges)
 McGillivray Pass – British Columbia (Bendor Range/Cadwallader Range)
 Mission Pass – British Columbia (Pacific Ranges)
 Pemberton Pass – British Columbia (Pacific Ranges/Lillooet Ranges)
 Railroad Pass (aka Railway Pass) – British Columbia (Pacific Ranges)
 Singing Pass – British Columbia (Garibaldi Ranges)
 Raindoor Pass – British Columbia (Garibaldi Ranges)
 Surel Pass – British Columbia (Kitimat Ranges)
 Ring Pass – British Columbia (Pacific Ranges)
 Taylor Pass – British Columbia (Chilcotin Ranges)
 Tyoax Pass – British Columbia (Chilcotin Ranges)
 Warner Pass – British Columbia (Chilcotin Ranges)
 Wedge Pass – British Columbia (Garibaldi Ranges)
 White Pass – Alaska, British Columbia
 Wolverine Pass – British Columbia (Chilcotin Ranges)
 Wolverine Pass – British Columbia (Garibaldi Ranges)

Hazelton Mountains 
 Atna Pass

Interior Plateau 
 Clapperton Creek Summit – British Columbia
 Festuca Pass – British Columbia
 Pennask Summit – British Columbia

Mackenzie Mountains 
 Macmillan Pass – Yukon, Northwest Territories
 Howard's Pass – Yukon, Northwest Territories

Monashee Mountains 
 Bonanza Pass – British Columbia
 Canoe Pass – British Columbia
 Eagle Pass – British Columbia
 Joss Pass, British Columbia
 Monashee Pass – British Columbia
 Pettipiece Pass – British Columbia
 Sherman Pass – Washington

Rocky Mountains 

 Abbot Pass, Alberta and British Columbia
 Arapaho Pass, Front Range, Colorado
 Arapaho Pass, Rabbit Ears Range, Colorado
 Argentine Pass, Colorado
 Athabasca Pass, Alberta and British Columbia
 Badger Pass, Montana
 Bald Mountain Pass, Utah
 Banner Summit, Idaho
 Bannock Pass, Idaho and Montana
 Beartooth Pass, Wyoming
 Beaver Pass, British Columbia
 Berthoud Pass, Colorado
 Big Hole Pass, Montana
 Big Mountain Pass, Utah
 Black Bear Pass, Colorado
 Boreas Pass, Colorado
 Boulder-Grand Pass, Colorado
 Bozeman Pass, Montana
 Bridger Pass, Wyoming
 Buchanan Pass, Colorado
 Buffalo Pass, Colorado
 Bush Pass, Alberta and British Columbia
 Cameron Pass, Colorado
 Carcajou Pass, Alberta and British Columbia
 Cerro Summit, Colorado
 Chief Joseph Pass, Idaho and Montana
 Coal Bank Pass, Colorado
 Cochetopa Pass, Colorado
 Cordova Pass, Colorado
 Cottonwood Pass, Colorado
 Craig Pass, Wyoming
 Crowsnest Pass, Alberta and British Columbia
 Cucharas Pass, Colorado
 Cumbres Pass, Colorado
 Currant Creek Pass, Colorado
 Dallas Divide, Colorado
 Dead Indian Pass, Wyoming
 Douglas Pass, Colorado
 Dunraven Pass, Wyoming
 Elbow Pass, Alberta
 Elk Pass, Alberta and British Columbia
 Fall River Pass, Colorado
 Fourth of July Summit, Idaho
 Fraser Pass, British Columbia
 Fremont Pass, Colorado
 Galena Summit, Idaho
 Georgia Pass, Colorado
 Geyser Pass, Utah
 Gibbons Pass, Montana
 Glorieta Pass, New Mexico
 Gore Pass, Colorado
 Grand Mesa Summit, Colorado
 Granite Pass, Wyoming
 Guanella Pass, Colorado
 Hagerman Pass, Colorado
 Halfmoon Pass, Colorado
 Hancock Pass, Colorado
 Hardscrabble Pass, Colorado
 Highwood Pass, Alberta
 Homestake Pass, Montana
 Hoosier Pass, Colorado
 Howse Pass, Alberta and British Columbia
 Imogene Pass, Colorado
 Independence Pass, Colorado
 Jarvis Pass, British Columbia
 Jones Pass, Colorado
 Kakwa Pass, British Columbia
 Kebler Pass, Colorado
 Kenosha Pass, Colorado
 Kicking Horse Pass, Alberta and British Columbia
 Kingman Pass, Wyoming
 Kings Hill Pass, Montana
 Kokomo Pass, Colorado
 La Manga Pass, Colorado
 La Poudre Pass, Colorado
 La Veta Pass, Colorado
 Lake Pass, Colorado
 Lemhi Pass, Idaho and Montana
 Lewis and Clark Pass, Montana
 Lizard Head Pass, Colorado
 Logan Pass, Montana
 Lolo Pass, Idaho and Montana
 Lookout Pass, Idaho and Montana
 Lost Trail Pass, Idaho and Montana
 Loveland Pass, Colorado
 MacDonald Pass, Montana
 Marias Pass, Montana
 Marshall Pass, Colorado
 McClure Pass, Colorado
 McGregor Pass, British Columbia
 Milner Pass, Colorado
 Molas Pass, Colorado
 Monarch Pass, Colorado
 Monida Pass, Idaho and Montana
 Monkman Pass, British Columbia
 Monument Hill, Colorado
 Mores Creek Summit, Idaho
 Mosca Pass, Colorado
 Mosquito Pass, Colorado
 Muddy Pass, Colorado
 Mullan Pass, Montana
 Muncho Pass, British Columbia
 Nez Perce Pass, Idaho and Montana
 North La Veta Pass, Colorado
 North Pass, Colorado
 Ohio Pass, Colorado
 Old Monarch Pass, Colorado
 Old Rabbit Ears Pass, Colorado
 Original Monarch Pass, Colorado
 Palliser Pass, Alberta and British Columbia
 Palmer Saddle, Colorado
 Pawnee Pass, Colorado
 Phillips Pass, Alberta and British Columbia
 Pine Pass, British Columbia
 Piper Pass, Alberta
 Pipestone Pass, Montana
 Poncha Pass, Colorado
 Powder River Pass, Wyoming
 Ptarmigan Pass, Front Range, Colorado
 Ptarmigan Pass, Sawatch Range, Colorado
 Rabbit Ears Pass, Colorado
 Raton Pass, Colorado and New Mexico
 Raynolds Pass, Idaho and Montana
 Red Hill Pass, Colorado
 Red Mountain Pass, Colorado
 Red Rock Pass, Idaho
 Rogers Pass, Colorado
 Rogers Pass, Montana
 Rollins Pass, Colorado
 Sangre de Cristo Pass, Colorado
 Schofield Pass, Colorado
 Searle Pass, Colorado
 Shrine Pass, Colorado
 Sifton Pass, British Columbia
 Simpson Pass, Alberta and British Columbia
 Sinclair Pass, British Columbia
 Slumgullion Summit, Colorado
 Smuts Pass, Alberta
 Soldier Summit, Utah
 South Pass, Wyoming
 Spring Creek Pass, Colorado
 Spring Valley Summit, Idaho
 Stone Man Pass, Colorado
 Stony Pass, Colorado
 Summit Pass, British Columbia
 Sunset Pass, Alberta
 Sunwapta Pass, Alberta
 Sylvan Pass, Wyoming
 Targhee Pass, Idaho and Montana
 Tennessee Pass, Colorado
 Teton Pass, Wyoming
 Thompson Pass, Alberta and British Columbia
 Togwotee Pass, Wyoming
 Tonquin Pass, Alberta and British Columbia
 Trail Ridge High Point, Colorado
 Trout Creek Pass, Colorado
 Two Ocean Pass, Wyoming
 Unaweep Divide, Colorado
 Ute Pass, Colorado
 Vail Pass, Colorado
 Vasquez Pass, Colorado
 Vermilion Pass, Alberta and British Columbia
 Wapiti Pass, British Columbia
 Webster Pass, Colorado
 White Bird Hill Summit, Idaho
 Wilkerson Pass, Colorado
 Willow Creek Pass, Colorado
 Willow Creek Pass, Montana
 Wind River Pass, Colorado
 Windy Pass, Colorado
 Wolf Creek Pass, Colorado
 Wolverine Pass, British Columbia
 Yellowhead Pass, Alberta and British Columbia
 Yellowjacket Pass, Colorado

Selkirk Mountains 
 Argonaut Pass – British Columbia
 Asulkan Pass – British Columbia
 Rogers Pass – British Columbia
 Kootenay Pass – British Columbia
 Retallack Pass aka Zincton Pass – British Columbia

Sierra Nevada 

 Barker Pass
 Beckwourth Pass (lowest Sierra Nevada pass at )
 Carson Pass
 Devil's Gate Pass
 Donahue Pass
 Donner Pass (pass of the Donner Party and Lincoln Highway)
 Donner Summit (Euer Saddle, pass of Interstate 80)
 Ebbetts Pass
 Echo Summit (Johnson's Pass, pass of U.S. Route 50)
 Emigrant Pass (at least 2, one in Tahoe National Forest, another near Mt. Lassen)
 Forester Pass
 Fredonyer Pass
 Glen Pass
 Henness Pass
 Luther Pass
 Monitor Pass
 Muir Pass
 Roller Pass
 Sherman Pass
 Sonora Pass
 Tioga Pass (highest Sierra Nevada roadway pass at )
 Trail Crest
 Walker Pass
 Yuba Pass

Stikine Ranges
 Aeroplane Pass
 Metsantan Pass
 Sifton Pass

Tehachapi Mountains 
 Oak Creek Pass
 Tehachapi Pass
 Tejon Pass

Other 
 Emory Pass – New Mexico, NM Highway 152 crosses this pass in the Black Range between the towns of Kingston (east side) and San Lorenzo (west side). 
 Fremont Pass – Nevada, in the Lake Range, 8 mi. NE of Pyramid Lake
 Newhall Pass – California, separating the San Gabriel Mountains from the Santa Susana Mountains
 Pickle Gap – a mountain pass in Arkansas
 San Gorgonio Pass – California, separates Mount San Gorgonio and the Transverse ranges from Mount San Jacinto and the Peninsular ranges
 Tijeras Pass – New Mexico, main route through the Sandia and Manzano Mountains east of Albuquerque
 Polkorridoren, Peary Land, Greenland

South America

Andes

Northern Andes
 Collado del Condor – Pico el Águila, Mérida (state) 
 La Línea, Colombia (connects between Ibagué and Armenia)
 Papallacta Pass, Ecuador – 4,200 metres (13,766 feet)

Central Andes
 Abra de Porculla, Peru (connects between Olmos and Marañón) — , lowest pass in the Andes
 Ticlio, Peru — 
 Paso Chungará, Chile–Bolivia (on road 11 and 4, connects between Arica and La Paz) — 
 Paso Colchane – Pisigua, Chile–Bolivia (on road 15 and 12, connects between Iquique and Oruro) —

Southern Andes
 Abra del Acay, Salta Province, Argentina (connects between La Poma and San Antonio de los Cobres) —  (3.09 miles high)
 Abra de Chorillos, Salta Province, Argentina (connects between San Antonio de los Cobres and Caucharí)
 Paso de Agua Negra, Chile–Argentina (connects between La Serena and San José de Jachal)
 Paso Cardenal Samoré (Formerly known as Puyehue), Chile–Argentina (connects between Osorno and San Carlos de Bariloche) — 
 Paso Carirriñe, Chile–Argentina (connects between Panguipulli and Junín de los Andes) — 
 Paso Derecho, Chile–Argentina (connects between Los Ángeles and Zapala)
 Paso Futalefú, Chile–Argentina (connects between Chaitén and Esquel)
 Paso Huahum, Chile–Argentina (connects between Panguipulli and San Martín de los Andes) — 
 Paso de Ipela, Chile–Argentina (connects between Futrono and San Martín de los Andes) — ≈ 
 Paso de Jama, Chile–Argentina (connects between San Pedro de Atacama and Susques) — ≈ 
 Paso Libertadores, Chile–Argentina (connects between Santiago and Mendoza) — ≈ 
 Paso Mamuil Malal, Chile–Argentina (connects between Pucón and Junín de los Andes)
 Paso Pampa Alta (also known as Puesto Viejo), Chile–Argentina (connects between Coihaique and Alto Río Senguer) — 
 Paso Pehuenche, Chile–Argentina (connects between San Clemente and Bardas Blancas)
 Paso Pérez Rosales, Chile–Argentina (connects between Puerto Varas and San Carlos de Bariloche)
 Paso Pino Hachado, Chile–Argentina (connects between Temuco and Zapala) — 
 Paso Pircas Negras, Chile–Argentina (connects between Copiapó and Chilecito)
 Paso Río Encuentro, Chile–Argentina (connects between Palena and Tecka)
 Paso Roballo, Chile–Argentina (connects between Cochrane and Bajo Caracoles)
 Paso San Francisco, Chile–Argentina (connects between Copiapó and Fiambalá) — 
 Paso de Sico, Chile–Argentina (connects between Socaire and Catua) — 
 Chile Route 23 — 
 Chile Route 27 —

Other
 Abra de la Ventana, Sierra de la Ventana, Buenos Aires Province, Argentina
 Contulmo Pass, Nahuelbuta Range part of larger Chilean Coast Range (connects between Contulmo and Purén)
 Serra do Rio do Rastro, Brazil

See also
 List of highest paved roads in Europe

References

External links

Mountain Passes
 
Mountain Passes